Rag Ball is a 1930 German comedy film directed by Carl Heinz Wolff and starring Harry Frank, Irene Ambrus, and Kurt Lilien. The title refers to a costume ball in which the guests turn up in tatters and rags.

The film's sets were designed by the art directors Gustav A. Knauer and Willy Schiller.

Cast

References

Bibliography

External links

1930 films
1930 comedy films
German comedy films
Films of the Weimar Republic
1930s German-language films
Films directed by Carl Heinz Wolff
German black-and-white films
1930s German films